{{Infobox football biography
| name = Wagner Querino
| image = 
| fullname = Wagner Querino da Silva
| birth_date = 
| birth_place = Pilar, Alagoas, Brazil
| height = 1.74 m
| position = Forward
Nickname'" Wagner Querino,park eun-ho and príncipe.
| currentclub = 
| clubnumber = 
| youthyears1 = 
| youthclubs1 = 
| years1 = 2010
| clubs1 = Londrina
| caps1 = 
| goals1 = 
| years2 = 2011
| clubs2 = Daejeon Citizen
| caps2 = 27
| goals2 = 11
| years3 = 2012
| clubs3 = Al Nassr
| caps3 = 7
| goals3 = 4
| years4 = 2013
| clubs4 = Al Hidd
| caps4 = 18
| goals4 = 14
| years5 = 2014
| clubs5 = FC Anyang
| caps5 = 17
| goals5 = 1
| nationalyears1 = 
| nationalteam1 = 
| nationalcaps1 = 
| nationalgoals1 = 
| pcupdate = 24 November 2014
| ntupdate = 
}}Wagner Querino da Silva''' (born 31 January 1987) is a Brazilian professional footballer who plays for South Korean side FC Anyang as forward.

Wagner Querino joined South Korean club Daejeon Citizen on 20 January 2011 and registered for the league under the Korean name "Park Eun-ho" which is pronounced similarly to his real name.

References

External links 

Wagner Querino at playmakerstats.com (English version of ogol.com.br)
sofascore.com
fmdataba.com
soesporte.com.br
academiadasapostasmz.com
operarioferroviario.com.br
namu.wiki
m.blog.naver.com
chosun.com
dhcfc.kr
dhcfc.kr
m.joongdo.co.kr
m.daejonilbo.com
zepero.com
m.egloos.zum.com
m.blog.daum.net
ggilbo.com
footballk.net
cctoday.co.kr
m.mediaus.co.kr
news.joins.com
capo.co.kr

1987 births
Living people
Brazilian footballers
Brazilian expatriate footballers
Daejeon Hana Citizen FC players
Al Nassr FC players
FC Anyang players
K League 1 players
K League 2 players
Brazilian expatriate sportspeople in South Korea
Expatriate footballers in South Korea
Brazilian expatriate sportspeople in Saudi Arabia
Expatriate footballers in Saudi Arabia
Expatriate footballers in Bahrain
Saudi Professional League players
Association football forwards